Anomonotes is a genus of longhorn beetles of the subfamily Lamiinae, containing the following species:

 Anomonotes annulipes Heller, 1917
 Anomonotes leucomerus Heller, 1917

References

Enicodini